The Punjab Police (abbreviated as PP) is the police agency responsible for law enforcement and investigations within the state of Punjab, India. Punjab Police has a broad array of specialized services, including the prevention and detection of crime, maintenance of law and order and the enforcement of the Constitution of India.
Its headquarters are located at Jan Marg, Chandigarh. On 7 September 2011, Punjab Police started a video conferencing service to redress problems of NRIs. The present DGP of Punjab Police is Gaurav Yadav IPS. He is an IPS officer of 1992 batch.

History
After Indian independence, Punjab police were initially responsible for the protection of the Indo-Pakistan as well as the Indo-Chinese borders before BSF and ITBP were created.

Rapid Rural Police Response System
Punjab is the first state of India to have a Rapid Rural Police Response System which provides City PCR-like response service in rural areas. As Punjab Police adopted Computer-Aided-Dispatch (CAD) system for Dial 100 system, 289 four-wheelers and 724 GPS fitted motorcycles are being used.

Punjab Highway Patrol 
Punjab Police have global positioning system (GPS) tracker and vehicle registration search device equipped highway patrol vehicles.

Crime Investigation Agency 
Crime Investigation Agency or CIA staff is a special branch of Punjab Police. The crucial or unsolved criminal cases like smuggling, kidnapping, narcotics, terrorism and murder are handed over to them. This branch of police is known for its ways to interrogate the culprit who committed the crime.

Night policing scheme 
Punjab is the first state in the country to launch a night policing scheme with independent cadre, command and structure of a 4,000 strong police force for prevention of offences at night time.

Punjab Bureau of Investigation 
Punjab Bureau of Investigation was set up in 2019 with 4521 dedicated new posts. Punjab is the first state of India to form a Bureau of Investigation, and separated law & order duties from investigation functions by bringing all investigation staff of 7,772 under a unified wing command.

The Bureau of Investigation conducts investigation into civil and criminal cases registered at various police stations and is equipped with: 

 Mobile forensic evidence collection units 
 Regional forensic science labs
 Modern cyber crime unit 
 Modern interview rooms
 Modern women police stations in all districts

Training centres
 Police Recruits Training Centre (PRTC), Jahan Khelan
 Punjab Police Academy (PPA), Phillaur
 Recruit Training Centre, PAP, Jalandhar
 Commando Training Centre (CTC), Bahadurgarh, Patiala
 In Service Training Centre, Kapurthala

Armed battalions
 Punjab Armed Police
 India Reserve Battalions
 Punjab Commando Police

The headquarters of the Punjab Armed Police are located at Jalandhar while the India Reserve Battalions are stationed at Sangrur, Amritsar, Patiala, Ludhiana and Jalandhar and the Punjab Commando Police at Bahadurgarh (Patiala) and S.A.S. Nagar (Mohali).

Weapons and equipment

PP was equipped with .303 rifles, AK-47,AK-56 and 561 Sten Guns but modernisation with advanced weapons is now taking place.

Vehicles 
Punjab Police have 3083 vehicles and patrol cars like Mahindra Scorpio Getaways and Maruti Gypsys. PP also have motorcycles equipped with GPS and Multi Utility Vehicles equipped with GPS and CCTV cameras.

Cyber Crime Cell Punjab 
Punjab Police have a dedicated cybercrime cell to deal with cybercrime in the state headed by ADGP ranked police officer having an office in Phase 4, S.A.S Nagar.

Punjab SWAT 

Punjab Police Special Weapons and Tactics (SWAT) team was formed in 2010. They are usually tasked with protection duties. They are highly trained on the lines of National Security Guard by Israel's Mossad through private company Athena Security, deployed by the Punjab Government. All the commandos are under 28 years of age, thus making them fit and capable of tasks meant for commandos. Their main work is to fight against any terrorist attack if it occurs in Punjab State. They have been trained exclusively in Krav Maga, room intervention, close and open techniques and other secret tactics.

The SWAT is provided with various state-of-art equipment and the latest technology. The teams are provided with:

 Bullet-proof transport
 Lightweight bullet-proof jackets and helmets
 Hands-free radio sets 
 Complete anti-trauma bodysuit with level-2 protection
 Riot control helmet 
 Gas masks
 Shock shields
 Laser guns
 Gas guns
 Pepper gun launcher

Weapons
Glock 17 pistol
Brugger & Thomet MP9 sub machine gun
Heckler & Koch MP5 sub machine gun
MTAR 21 X95 assault rifle
SIG 552 assault rifle
AK-47 assault rifle
Steyr SSG 69 sniper rifle
CornerShot
Night vision device

Major operation 
Punjab SWAT handled counter-terrorism operation at Dina Nagar Police Station in a 2015 Gurdaspur attack by killing all three suspected Lashkar-e-Taiba terrorists.

Commemoration Day
Every year, 21 October is celebrated as Commemoration Day by Punjab Police.

Hierarchy
Officers
Director General of Police (DGP)
Additional Director General of Police
Inspector General of Police (IGP)
Deputy Inspector General of Police 
Senior Superintendent of Police
Superintendent of Police (SP)
Additional Superintendent of Police 
Assistant SP (IPS) or Deputy SP (PPS)

Sub-ordinates
Inspector of Police 
Sub-Inspector of Police (SI)
Assistant Sub-Inspector of Police (ASI)
Head Constable 
Senior Constable 
Constable

In popular culture 
Members of the Punjab Police have been frequently portrayed in films. Some of the prominent ones are:

Punjabi films
 ' '  DSP DEV
 Jatt & Juliet 2 (2013) 
 Baaz (2014)
 Mahaul Theek Hai (1999)
 Police in Pollywood (2014)
 Punjab 1984 (2014)

Hindi films
 Jo Bole So Nihaal (2005)
 Udta Punjab (2016)

Praise
Sardar Vallabhbhai Patel, the first Home Minister of India praised Punjab Police saying,

See also
 Law enforcement in India

References
 Punjab Police Act, 2007

External links
 Official website
 Official Twitter account

Government of Punjab, India
State law enforcement agencies of India
Punjab Police (India)
1861 establishments in British India
Government agencies established in 1861